Billy Bob's Texas is a country music nightclub located in the Fort Worth Stockyards, Texas, United States. It promotes itself as "The World's Largest Honky Tonk," at 100,000 square feet of interior space and nearly 20 acres of parking space.

History 

Billy Bob Barnett, a Texas A&M University graduate and professional football player, teamed up with nightclub owner and former car salesman, Spencer Taylor. While looking for a location to fit their idea, the men decided upon an abandoned 100,000-square-foot department store that was at one time an open-air cattle barn. With some additional investors, Barnett and Taylor renovated the building's interior and exterior and opened the place to the public on April 1, 1981.  Billy Bob's closed in January 1988, and reopened in October 1988 under new ownership and management.  Holt Hickman, Don Jury, Steve Murrin and Billy Minick formed the new ownership group.

Mostly known for country music, the venue has also hosted acts such as Bob Hope and B.B. King.

In 1983, Merle Haggard, while on stage, offered each person in the crowd of 5,095, a one-ounce Canadian Club Whiskey with a water chaser. The drinks totaled 40 gallons and at the time, cost $12,737.50. The stunt earned Haggard a place in the Guinness Book of World Records as the purchaser of the biggest round ever.

Billy Bob's Texas celebrated its 35th anniversary in 2016. The celebration culminated in November with a weekend of shows from Shooter Jennings, Rival Sons and Willie Nelson.

Features 

In addition to the concert stage where the artists perform, Billy Bob’s Texas also has a dance floor, music memorabilia museum, pool hall, bar, restaurant, gift shop, and small dirt arena where professional bull riding is held on the weekends during concert days. 

Private events are also held at the venue.

Live at Billy Bob's Texas Music Series

Since 1999, the Smith Music Group, a music publishing company in Fort Worth, Texas has issued a continuing series of live albums recorded by major country music artists at Billy Bob's. The albums are titled Live at Billy Bob's Texas, with a few exceptions. The list is currently over forty performances. Artists so far have included:

Lynn Anderson
Asleep at the Wheel
Moe Bandy & Joe Stampley
Jason Boland & the Stragglers
Wade Bowen
T. Graham Brown
Roy Clark
Roger Clyne and the Peacemakers
David Allan Coe
John Conlee
Earl Thomas Conley
Cooder Graw
Cross Canadian Ragweed
Charlie Daniels Band
Joe Diffie
Deryl Dodd
Bleu Edmondson
Exile
Kevin Fowler
Janie Fricke
The Gatlin Brothers
Josh Grider
Pat Green
Merle Haggard
Jack Ingram
Shooter Jennings
Stoney LaRue
Johnny Lee
Justin McBride
Cory Morrow
Micky & the Motorcars
Michael Martin Murphey
Willie Nelson
No Justice
Eddy Raven
Collin Raye
Brandon Rhyder
Charlie Robison
Randy Rogers Band
Billy Joe Shaver
T. G. Sheppard
Gary Stewart
Doug Stone
Jackson Taylor & The Sinners
Tanya Tucker
Mark Wills

In popular culture
Billy Bob's Texas has also been host to many movie and television projects. Baja Oklahoma (Willie Nelson, Lesley Ann Warren), Over the Top (Sylvester Stallone), and Necessary Roughness (Scott Bakula, Sinbad) have all been filmed there.

Billy Bob’s is used extensively playing itself during location filming for several episodes in Season 7 of the original TV series Dallas.

Professional wrestling was also filmed at the venue in the mid to late 1980s.

References

External links

Official website

1981 establishments in Texas
Music venues completed in 1981
Culture of Fort Worth, Texas
Music venues in Texas
Economy of Fort Worth, Texas
Tourist attractions in Fort Worth, Texas
Drinking establishments in Texas